Lake Gogebic is a census-designated place (CDP) in Bergland Township, Ontonagon County, Michigan, United States. It is situated on the north shore of Lake Gogebic, the largest natural inland lake on the Upper Peninsula of Michigan. The CDP includes the unincorporated communities of Lake Gogebic and Merriweather, and it is bordered to the east by the community of Bergland.

The northern edge of the CDP follows highway M-28, which leads east  to Bruce Crossing and southwest  to Wakefield.

Lake Gogebic was first listed as a CDP prior to the 2020 census.

Demographics

References 

Census-designated places in Ontonagon County, Michigan
Census-designated places in Michigan
Unincorporated communities in Ontonagon County, Michigan
Unincorporated communities in Michigan